Billy  Gilliland (born 27 March 1957) is a former badminton player from Scotland who excelled from the mid-1970s through the mid-1980s.

Career 
Although he won the Scottish national singles title in 1979, the tall, angular Gilliland was a doubles specialist at the international level with his greatest success coming in mixed doubles. Gilliland won mixed doubles at the prestigious All-England Championships with England's Nora Perry in 1985. He had previously reached the All-England final in both men's doubles and mixed doubles in 1982. He was a mixed doubles bronze medalist at the 1977 IBF World Championships with Joanna Flockhart. Though he won numerous tournaments abroad, perhaps Gilliland's most impressive badminton accomplishment was sharing twelve consecutive Scottish national mixed doubles titles equally with two partners, between 1976 and 1987. With regular partner Dan Travers, he won nine Scottish national men's doubles titles during that period, and men's doubles at the Commonwealth Games in 1986. He now coaches badminton in 
a badminton academy.

Achievements

World Games 
Men's doubles

IBF World Grand Prix 
The World Badminton Grand Prix sanctioned by International Badminton Federation (IBF) from 1983 to 2006.

Men's doubles

References

External links
 
 

1957 births
Living people
Scottish male badminton players
Badminton coaches
Badminton players at the 1978 Commonwealth Games
Commonwealth Games medallists in badminton
Commonwealth Games gold medallists for Scotland
Commonwealth Games silver medallists for Scotland
Commonwealth Games bronze medallists for Scotland
World Games medalists in badminton
World Games bronze medalists
Competitors at the 1981 World Games
Medallists at the 1978 Commonwealth Games
Medallists at the 1986 Commonwealth Games